Brigette Peterson is an American politician serving as the current mayor of Gilbert, Arizona. A Republican, Peterson was elected mayor in the 2020 election and has served since 2021. Peterson was previously a member of town council and the town's planning commission. In 2018, she had served as the Vice-mayor of Gilbert, Arizona.

References 

Living people
Mayors of places in Arizona
21st-century American women politicians
Republican Party (United States) politicians
Year of birth missing (living people)
21st-century American politicians